Howmeh Rural District is in Do Tappeh District of Khodabandeh County, Zanjan province, Iran. At the National Census of 2006, its population was 19,186 in 4,073 households, when it was part of the Central District. There were 19,592 inhabitants in 5,364 households at the following census of 2011. At the most recent census of 2016, the population of the rural district was 18,005 in 5,256 households. The largest of its 25 villages was Do Tappeh-ye Sofla, with 4,094 people. In 2019, the rural district was elevated to the status of a district, divided into two rural districts, and retained its name as part of the larger district.

References 

Khodabandeh County

Rural Districts of Zanjan Province

Populated places in Zanjan Province

Populated places in Khodabandeh County